Steavanus Wihardja is an Indonesian short track speed skater. He competed at the 2019 Southeast Asian Games in Manila, Philippines.

References 

Year of birth missing (living people)
Place of birth missing (living people)
Living people
Competitors at the 2017 Southeast Asian Games
Competitors at the 2019 Southeast Asian Games
Indonesian short track speed skaters
Southeast Asian Games medalists in short track speed skating
Southeast Asian Games silver medalists for Indonesia
Southeast Asian Games bronze medalists for Indonesia
Short track speed skaters at the 2017 Asian Winter Games